Inside My Heart is the first solo debut album of singer/actress/model and Are You the Next Big Star? female winner Frencheska Farr. This 10-track album was produced and released by GMA Records on December 8, 2010.

Background
Inside My Heart contains 10 which composed of three OPM original and three revival tracks. It is Frencheska's first album under GMA Records and was released on December 8, 2010. "Her debut album with GMA Records, Frencheska & Geoff, was awarded platinum. At such a young age, Frencheska is being recognized as one of the movers of the music industry and it's a privilege for GMA Records to produce another winner for her."

Singles
Today I'll See the Sun debuted December 12, 2010 music video debuted on the same day. Isama Mo Ako debuted last February during Temptation of Wife's airtime, also the theme song from Captain Barbell (2011). Also includes Sa Pangarap Ko was the theme song from Alakdana, in which stars by Louise delos Reyes, Paulo Avelino, Ritchie Paul Gutierrez and Alden Richards.

Other songs
Inside My Heart was released as a single and an official soundtrack and to promote the 2012 GMA's Korean drama primetime block, Moon Embracing the Sun.

Credits
 Produced by Kedy Sanchez
 Executive Producer: Buddy C. Medina
 In Charge of Marketing: Rene A. Salta
 A&R Supervision: Kedy Sanchez
 Production Coordination: Louella Tiongson

Recorded and mixed at
 GMA Network Recording Studios
 Sound Engineer: Oyet San Diego
 Additional Engineering: Edwin Dimaano, Archie Gaba

Track listing

 track 1 - "Everytime" was originally by Maoui David .
 track 3 - "Today I'll See The Sun" was originally recorded by Karel Marquez.
 track 6 - "Suddenly It's Magic" is a 1987 original of Vesta Williams and used as a theme song from My Valentine Girls.
 track 7 - "Ang Pag-ibig Kong Ito" is the theme song of the 2010 GMA's Korean drama, Temptation of Wife.
 track 8 - "I Still Haven't Found (What I'm Looking For)"  was originally recorded by U2.

Certifications

References

2010 albums
GMA Music albums
Pop albums by Filipino artists